Chainpur is a Town and corresponding community development block in Kaimur district of Bihar, India. It is located 11km west of Bhabua, the district headquarters of kaimur district .As of 2011, the village population was 11,306, in 1,653 households. The block population was 187,692, in 30,189 households. The main village Chainpur was also before known as Malikpur on the name of zamindar Malik Khan one of the descendants from the family of Bhabua. Chainpur was established in early 1600s. Chainpur was the capital of Chainpur Estate.

Geography 
Chainpur lies in the hilly tracts of Kaimur district.

Demographics 
Chainpur is a rural block with no major urban centres. The block's sex ratio in 2011 was 939 females for every 1000 males, which was the highest sex ratio in Kaimur district (the district-wide ratio was 920). The sex ratio was higher in the 0-6 age group, where it was 968 (the district-wide value was 942). Members of scheduled castes made up 20.06% of the block population and members of scheduled castes made up 4.87%. The block's literacy rate was 62.53%, compared to the district-wide average of 69.34%. There was a 21.79% gender literacy gap (compared with the district-wide 20.97%), with 73.04% of men but only 51.25% of women able to read and write.

Most of the Chainpur block workforce in 2011 was employed in agriculture, with 18.52% being agricultural labourers who owned or leased their own land and another 58.78% being agricultural labourers who worked someone else's land for wages. Another 6.31% worked in household industries, and the remaining 16.39% were other workers. Men made up around two-thirds of the block workforce, with there being 43,681 male and 20,795 female workers in 2011.

History 
In Chainpur is the mausoleum of Bakhtiar Khan, the son-in-law of Sher Shah Suri. There is also the Hindu shrine of Harsu Brahm. According to the shrine's tradition, the Kanyakubja Brahmin priest Harshu Pandey, who was in the service of Raja Shaliwahan, committed suicide in protest of the demolition of his house, but when his body was cremated at Varanasi, he was seen miraculously standing as if still alive. The family of Chainpur became immensely powerful during Mughal empire. Chainpur was made a jagir during Mughals and a fort name as "Chainpur ki rani ka kila" was made by the family. Sikarwar Rajput also rule in chainpur

Villages 
Chainpur block contains the following 177 villages, of which 151 are inhabited and 26 are uninhabited:

References 

Villages in Kaimur district